Kenrick Emanuel (born November 21, 1968) is a Dominican former player and manager.

Football career 
Emanuel played in the Canadian National Soccer League with London City from 1995 till 1999. He played with the Dominica national football team from 1988 till 2000. He was the Dominican team captain from 1994 till 2000. After his retirement in 2000 he managed the Dominica national team.

References 

1968 births
Living people
Dominica international footballers
Dominica footballers
Dominica expatriate footballers
Expatriate soccer players in Canada
Dominica expatriate sportspeople in Canada
London City players
Canadian National Soccer League players
Canadian Soccer League (1998–present) players
Dominica national football team managers
Association football forwards
Dominica football managers